Joseph Patrick Kennedy Jr. (July 25, 1915 – August 12, 1944) was the eldest of the nine children born to Joseph P. Kennedy Sr. and Rose Fitzgerald Kennedy. A US Navy lieutenant, he was killed in action during World War II while serving as a land-based patrol bomber pilot, and posthumously awarded the Navy Cross.

His father had aspirations for him to become US president. He  was a delegate to the 1940 Democratic National Convention and planned to run for a seat in the US House of Representatives after his military service as the first stepping stone on the path to the White House. His death while participating in a top-secret mission in 1944 caused his father to transfer his aspirations to his next-oldest son, John F. Kennedy, who followed the path first planned for his brother by advancing from the House to the US Senate and then to the presidency.

Early life and education 
Kennedy was born on July 25, 1915, in Hull, Massachusetts. He first attended the Dexter School in Brookline, Massachusetts, with his brother John. In 1933, he graduated from the Choate School in Wallingford, Connecticut. He then entered Harvard College, Cambridge, Massachusetts, from which he graduated in 1938 with a Bachelor of Arts degree in government. Kennedy participated in football, rugby, and crew and served on the student council. He then spent a year studying under the tutelage of Harold Laski at the London School of Economics before he enrolled at Harvard Law School.

Political ambitions and views
From a very young age, Kennedy was groomed by his father and predicted to be the first Roman Catholic US president. When he was born, his grandfather John F. Fitzgerald, the mayor of Boston, told the news: "This child is the future president of the nation." He often boasted that he would be president even without help from his father.

He was a Massachusetts delegate to the Democratic National Convention in 1940. He planned to run for the U.S. House from Massachusetts's 11th congressional district in 1946.

Kennedy had expressed approval of Adolf Hitler before the war began. His father sent him to visit Nazi Germany in 1934. He wrote to his father and praised Hitler's sterilization policy as "a great thing" that "will do away with many of the disgusting specimens of men." Kennedy explained, "Hitler is building a spirit in his men that could be envied in any country."

U.S. Navy 
Kennedy left before his final year of law school at Harvard to enlist in the US Naval Reserve on June 24, 1941. He entered flight training to be a naval aviator, received his wings, and was commissioned an ensign on May 5, 1942. He was assigned to Patrol Squadron 203 and then Bombing Squadron 110. In September 1943, he was sent to Britain and became a member of Bomber Squadron 110, Special Air Unit ONE, in 1944. He piloted land-based PB4Y Liberator patrol bombers on anti-submarine details during two tours of duty in the winter of 1943–1944. 

Kennedy was appointed a lieutenant on July 1, 1944. He had completed 25 combat missions and was eligible to return home. He instead volunteered for an Operation Aphrodite mission.

Operations Aphrodite and Anvil 
Operation Aphrodite made use of uncrewed, explosive-laden Army Air Corps Boeing B-17 Flying Fortress and Navy Consolidated PB4Y-1 Liberator bombers that were deliberately crashed into their targets under radio control. These "drone" aircraft could not take off safely on their own and so a crew of two would take off and fly to  before they activated the remote control system, armed the detonators, and parachuted from the aircraft. After trials, the first mission took place on August 4, 1944, against targets including the Fortress of Mimoyecques, an underground military complex under construction in northern France.

The U.S. Navy also participated in Operation Aphrodite, with its portion referred to as Operation Anvil. Kennedy had been appointed a lieutenant on July 1. After the US Army Air Corps operation missions were drawn up on July 23, Lieutenants Wilford John Willy and Kennedy were designated as the Navy's first Anvil flight crew. Willy, who was the executive officer of Special Air Unit 1, had also volunteered for the mission and pulled rank over Ensign James Simpson, who was Kennedy's regular co-pilot.

Anvil accident and death

On August 12, Kennedy and his co-pilot Willy flew a BQ-8 "robot" aircraft (a converted B-24 Liberator) for the Navy's first Aphrodite mission. Initially, two Lockheed Ventura mother planes and a Boeing B-17 navigation plane took off from RAF Fersfield, Norfolk, England at 1800 on Saturday, August 12, 1944.

Following them in a USAAF F-8 Mosquito to film the mission were pilot Lt. Robert A. Tunnel and combat cameraman Lt. David J. McCarthy, who filmed the event from the perspex nose of the aircraft. As planned, Kennedy and Willy remained aboard as the BQ-8 completed its first remote-controlled turn at  near the North Sea coast. Kennedy and Willy removed the safety pin, arming the explosive package, and Kennedy radioed the agreed code Spade Flush, his last known words. Two minutes later and well before the planned crew bailout, near RAF Manston, the Torpex explosive detonated prematurely and destroyed the Liberator, killing Kennedy and Willy instantly. Wreckage landed near the village of Blythburgh in Suffolk, England, causing widespread damage and small fires, but there were no injuries on the ground. According to one report, a total of 59 buildings were damaged in a nearby coastal town.

According to USAAF records, the trailing Mosquito "was flying 300 feet above and about 300 yards to the rear of the robot. Engineer photographer on this ship was injured, and the ship was damaged slightly by the explosion." The Mosquito, which made an immediate emergency landing at RAF Halesworth, belonged to the 325th Reconnaissance Wing, a unit under the command of the son of President Franklin Roosevelt, then Colonel Elliott Roosevelt, who years later claimed to have been aboard that trailing aircraft, and his version of the event has gained wide currency. However, Air Force records cannot substantiate it. Instead, an after-action account by the 8th Combat Camera Unit (CCU) noted:

The 8th CCU film of the event, as far as is known, has not been found.

The 20th Fighter Group out of Kings Cliffe, Northamptonshire, was tasked with providing escort to the Aphrodite mission. Escort consisted of P-51s out of the 55th and 79th Fighter Squadrons, each squadron providing two aircraft. VIII FC, Field Order 509 stated "20 GP (P-51's, 4 A/C) will proceed to Fersfield and land coordinating with operations where to provide close escort support to one B-34 special Operation."

Lieutenant John E. Klink noted in his mission summary report: "Took off to excort BXXX, 1 B24, 1 B17, 2 B34s, and 3 photo Recons (2 Mosq. -1 P38). When specially loaded B24 was at approx. 2000 ft. NE of Ipswich it exploded and crashed near small lake. No one got out of the plane. Rest of ships OK in spite of terrific concussion from explosion. All returned to base."

Accident investigation
Drone operations were paused for a month while equipment was re-evaluated and modified, and there would be no further Navy missions. The Navy's informal board of review, discussing a number of theories, discounted the possibility of the crew making a mistake or that suspected jamming or a stray signal could have armed and detonated the explosives. An electronics officer, Earl Olsen, who believed the wiring harness had a design defect, had warned Kennedy of that possibility the day before the mission but was ignored.

Later reports that Kennedy's final mission was kept top secret until many years later are negated by a detailed public account of the operation and Kennedy's death released in 1945.

Recognition and commemoration
Kennedy and Willy were both posthumously awarded the Navy Cross, the Air Medal, and the Purple Heart Medal.

The names of both men are listed on the Tablets of the Missing at the Cambridge American Cemetery and Memorial, a cemetery and chapel near the village of Madingley, Cambridgeshire, that commemorates Americans who died in World War II.

A commemorative headstone (cenotaph) for Joseph P. Kennedy Jr. was later erected at Arlington National Cemetery. A further memorial to him stands inside the fortress of Mimoyecques, France.

Military awards 
Kennedy's military decorations and awards include the following:

Joseph P. Kennedy Jr.'s Navy Cross citation reads:

Legacy
In 1946, the Navy named a destroyer after him, the  aboard which his younger brother, the future US Senator Robert F. Kennedy, briefly served. Among the highlights of its service are the blockade of Cuba during the Cuban Missile Crisis in 1962 and the afloat recovery teams for Gemini 6 and Gemini 7, both 1965 crewed spaceflights in NASA's Gemini program. It was decommissioned in 1973 and is now a floating museum in Battleship Cove, Fall River, Massachusetts.

In 1947, the Kennedys established the Joseph P. Kennedy Jr. Foundation and funded the construction of the Joseph P. Kennedy Jr. Memorial Hall at Boston College, which is now a part of Campion Hall and home to the college's Lynch School of Education. The foundation was led by his youngest brother, US Senator Edward Kennedy until his death, in August 2009. In 1957, the Lieutenant Joseph Patrick Kennedy Junior Memorial Skating Rink was opened in Hyannis, Massachusetts, with funds from the Joseph P. Kennedy Jr. Foundation.

In 1969, Hank Searls wrote a biography of Joseph Jr., The Lost Prince: Young Joe, the Forgotten Kennedy. A television movie based on Searls' book won a primetime Emmy in 1977. Peter Strauss played Kennedy as an adult and Lance Kerwin played him as a teenager in the film.

See also

 Kennedy curse
 Kennedy family
 Kennedy family tree
 Young Joe, the Forgotten Kennedy, a 1977 TV movie

References

External links

 JFK Letter on the Death of Brother Joe Kennedy Jr. Shapell Manuscript Foundation
 Eye Witness of Plane Crash, BlythburghWeb.co.uk; accessed September 26, 2017
Joseph Kennedy Jr., Untold History on History Hit TV

1915 births
1944 deaths
People from Brookline, Massachusetts
People from Hull, Massachusetts
Alumni of the London School of Economics
United States Navy personnel killed in World War II
Harvard Law School alumni
Joseph P
Military personnel from Massachusetts
Recipients of the Distinguished Flying Cross (United States)
Recipients of the Navy Cross (United States)
United States Navy officers
United States Navy pilots of World War II
Recipients of the Air Medal
Aviators killed in aviation accidents or incidents in England
Aviators from Massachusetts
Victims of aviation accidents or incidents in 1944
United States Navy reservists